Chess Wars (fully titled as Chess Wars: A Medieval Fantasy) is a 1996 computer chess game released for DOS by WizardWorks and developed by Art Data Interactive and Digital Arena Software. It is the last game to be released by Art Data Interactive.

Gameplay

Chess Wars is a 3D computer chess game that animates the movement of the pieces in a manner similar to Battle Chess. The game is notable for displaying full-motion video sequences when a piece is taken. Pieces on the board correspond to 'character pieces' representing actors for each piece on the chess board. The full-motion video sequences follow a loose story of two opposing kingdoms meeting on the battlefield.

The chess engine of Chess Wars contains several features, including strength settings, an enhanced move history and a 'guess move' mode, with a reported chess rating score of 2100 for 'Master' difficulty and 1000 for 'Beginner' difficulty on a standard computer. The game includes data from 60,000 masters' games and 4,000 opening variations as a reference for players.

Development

Full-motion video sequences were written and directed by screenwriter Paul W. Cooper in his first and only directorial role. Filming was supported with a cast of eighteen, plus six stuntmen, three camera units and over a hundred extras. Overall, the game features 60 minutes of full-motion video footage.

Art Data Interactive reportedly commissioned the footage before development of the software, which led to considerable delays. Alex Wells of Digital Arena Software was contracted to complete the code and programming for the DOS version of the game.

Chess Wars was announced by Art Data Interactive in 1995, originally intended for release on the 3DO in November 1995. Due to constraints with development, the game was ultimately released only for DOS.

Reception

Reviews

Reviews for Chess Wars were mixed. Chuck Klimushyn of Computer Games Strategy Plus stated "as a chess program, the game is adequate, but just barely", although found the full-motion video sequences "entertaining" and "varied enough to keep me from toggling them off. David Wildgoose of PC PowerPlay critiqued the sequences as "hideously embarrassing", recommending that players "disable the appalling FMV sequences", although praising the tutorial, graphics, and difficulty levels.

Legacy

The complex and costly production of Chess Wars was a contributing factor in the closure of Art Data Interactive in 1996-97. 3DO Magazine reported that Art Data Interactive "burnt up around half a million dollars" in producing the full-motion video sequences.

References

External links

1996 video games
DOS games
DOS-only games
Chess software
WizardWorks games
Multiplayer and single-player video games